is a Japanese actress and narrator. She works for Aoni Production. She is most known for originating the roles of Fujiko Mine (Lupin III), Honey Kisaragi (Cutie Honey), and Bakabon's Mama (Tensai Bakabon).

Early life
Eiko Masuyama was the youngest of four sisters. When she was young she spoke slowly. Her teacher told her "You can't talk properly". At age 12, she joined the Children's Theater Company to improve her speech. She studied under Miyoko Asō, overcoming the complex. She later became interested in acting.

Career 
When Masuyama was too old for the children's company, Sanno theatrical company was launched by actors Sandayū Dokumamushi and Yasushi Inayoshi.

She became a member of Aoni Production in the 1960s. She began to focus on voice acting because of its scheduling flexibility, to balance childcare and work.

In 2017, she was awarded the “Anime Outreach Category” at the Tokyo Anime Award Festival 2017.

She focuses on narration, but in anime works she sometimes replays the voices of earlier characters.

In 2021, she won the "Merit Award" at the 15th Seiyu Awards.

Filmography

Anime
1963
Astro Boy - Lucia, Kipiah

1965
Kimba the White Lion -
Super Jetter - Nanae
Prince Planet - Rico

1966
Leo the Lion - Rukio
Harris no Kaze - Kunimatsu's mother
Sally the Witch - Yumiko (debut)

1967
Gokū no Daibōken - Tatsuko

1968
Star of the Giants - Lumi Tachibana, Samon Chiyo
Sabu to Ichi Torimono Hikae -
The World of Hans Christian Andersen - Karen

1969
Attack No. 1 - Midori Hayakawa
Moomin -

1971
Andersen Monogatari - Candy, Anna
Shin Obake no Q-Tarō - U-ko
Marvelous Melmo -
Tensai Bakabon - Bakabon's Mama

1972
Dokonjō Gaeru - Pyonko
Devilman - Fire, Bella
Mahōtsukai Chappy - Chappy Hans Charles Grimm and Aesop Et Cetera
Lupin the Third Part I -  Catherine Burgess

1973
Jungle Kurobe - Mama Sarari
Microsuperman - 
Fables of the Green Forest - Polly
Cutie Honey - Honey Kisaragi

1974
Karate Master - Rikuya
Great Mazinger - Cleo
Vicky the Viking - Narrator
Hoshi no Ko Chobin - Queen Ekurea

1975
Arabian Nights: Sinbad's Adventures - 
Ikkyū-san - Ikkyuu's mother; Narrator; Tsubane Iyono
Gamba no Bōken - Oryuu; Shioji
Laura, the Prairie Girl - Caroline Ingalls
Ganso Tensai Bakabon - Bakabon's Mama
Maya the Honey Bee -

1976
Divine Demon-Dragon Gaiking - 
UFO Warrior Dai Apolon - 
Little Lulu and Her Little Friends - Little Lulu (episodes 1-3)
Candy Candy - Jane Brighton

1977
Lupin the Third Part II - Fujiko Mine
The Wild Swans - Elisa

1978
Nobody's Boy: Remi - 
Starzinger - Prof. Kitty
Captain Future - Joan Randall
Haikara-San: Here Comes Miss Modern - Kichiji

1980
Space Warrior Baldios - Amy Ratein
Back to the Forest - Mary

1981
Good Morning! Spank - Aiko's mother
Dogtanian and the Three Muskehounds - Milady

1982
Andromeda Stories - 
Urusei Yatsura - Misuzu (ep 43)
The Kabocha Wine - Hanae Aoba; Komachi
The Mysterious Cities of Gold - 
Dr Slump - Ribon Chan
Patalliro! - Afro 18

1983
Story of the Alps: My Annette - 
Perman - Sumire Hoshino / Pako

1984
Lupin III Part III - Fujiko Mine

1985
Shin Obake no Q-Tarō 2nd series - U-ko

1986
Maple Town Stories - Christine

1987
Lady Lady!! - Magdalene Wavebury

1988
Little Lord Fauntleroy - Mina
Himitsu no Akko-chan - Queen of the Mirror Country

1990
Heisei Tensai Bakabon - Bakabon's Mama
Magical Taluluto - Ina Kawai

1991
Mischievous Twins: The Tales of St. Clare's -

1994
Sailor Moon S: The Movie - Princess Snow Kaguya

1997
Cutie Honey Flash - Mitsuko Kanzaki

1998
Mamotte Shugogetten -

1999
Rerere no Tensai Bakabon - Bakabon's Mama

Dubbing

Live-action 
The Sound of Music (Baroness Elsa von Schraeder (Eleanor Parker))

Animation 
Josie and the Pussycats (Melody Valentine)

Awards

References

External links
 Official agency profile 
 Eiko Masuyama at GamePlaza Haruka Voice Acting Database 
 
 

1936 births
Living people
Aoni Production voice actors
Japanese child actresses
Japanese video game actresses
Japanese voice actresses
Voice actresses from Tokyo
20th-century Japanese actresses
21st-century Japanese actresses
Lupin the Third